Che Sui Khor Moral Uplifting Society is a Dejiao establishment located in Kota Kinabalu, Sabah, Malaysia. The centre has been opened since 1981.

Features 
The centre feature an assembly hall and an 11-storey pagoda. The pagoda was built in 2001 and completed in 2006 with architecture modelled after the Leifeng Pagoda in Hangzhou, China. Musa Aman, the Chief Minister of Sabah, officiated at its opening. The pagoda was given the nickname "Liu He" which means "peace, prosperity and harmony".

References

External links 
 
 

Buddhist temples in Malaysia
Taoist temples in Malaysia
Chinese-Malaysian culture
Pagodas in Malaysia
Religious buildings and structures completed in 1981
Buildings and structures in Kota Kinabalu
Tourist attractions in Sabah
20th-century Buddhist temples
20th-century Taoist temples
20th-century architecture in Malaysia